Maxville is an unincorporated community in Perry County, in the U.S. state of Ohio. Maxville Limestone, a natural limestone formation, was named after the community.

History
A post office was established at Maxville in 1855, and remained in operation until 1904. The community's name is derived from shortening and alteration of the name of William McCormick, a first settler.

Notable person
Edwin D. Ricketts, a U.S. Representative from Ohio, was born near Maxville in 1867.

References

Unincorporated communities in Perry County, Ohio
Unincorporated communities in Ohio
1855 establishments in Ohio
Populated places established in 1855